Mean reversion may refer to:
 Regression toward the mean
 Ornstein–Uhlenbeck process
 Mean reversion (finance)